James Thomson (October 31, 1910 – May 31, 1962) was an American rower. He competed in the men's coxless four at the 1936 Summer Olympics.

References

1910 births
1962 deaths
American male rowers
Olympic rowers of the United States
Rowers at the 1936 Summer Olympics
Sportspeople from Glasgow